Royal Hospital was a medical facility housed in a privately owned New York City structure called The Professional Building.

History 
Royal Hospital, at 2021 Grand Concourse, Bronx, NY 10453 was a 91-bed
 private hospital. In 1942 it was owned by Dr. Morris A. Mason.

By the mid-1970s, as the neighborhood declined, the focus of the hospital was increasingly abortions; ''New York Magazine wrote in 1973 that the hospital was "completely remodeled in the past eight years" but concluded that it "has seen better days."

References 

Defunct hospitals in the Bronx
History of the Bronx